Fiona O'Loughlin (born 8 September 1965) is an Irish Fianna Fáil politician who has been a Senator for the Administrative Panel since April 2020. She previously served as a Teachta Dála (TD) for the Kildare South constituency from 2016 to 2020. She also served as Chair of the Committee on Education and Social Protection from 2016 to 2020.

She was a member of Kildare County Council from 1999 to 2016.

She lost her Dáil seat at the 2020 general election. In April 2020, O'Loughlin was elected as a Senator for the Administrative Panel.

References

External links
Fiona O'Loughlin's page on the Fianna Fáil website

1965 births
Living people
Fianna Fáil TDs
Local councillors in County Kildare
Members of the 32nd Dáil
21st-century women Teachtaí Dála
Members of the 26th Seanad
21st-century women members of Seanad Éireann
Fianna Fáil senators